Rita Elissaiou Komodiki  is a Greek Cypriot physician and politician for Progressive Party of Working People and current mayoress (in exile) of the northern coastal city of Kyrenia (which is controlled by Northern Cyprus). Komodiki got a degree on Medicine from the National and Kapodistrian University of Athens and worked in several hospitals. During the 1973 war between Greek Cypriots and Turkish Cypriots she coordinated the attention of the wounded during the conflict. She was elected in the 2016 local elections and took office on 1 January 2017, being one of the four female elected mayoress in Cyprus.

References

Living people
People from Kyrenia
21st-century Cypriot women politicians
21st-century Cypriot politicians
National and Kapodistrian University of Athens alumni
Progressive Party of Working People politicians
Women mayors of places in Cyprus
Year of birth missing (living people)